Benjamin Filipović (1962 – 20 July 2006) was a Bosnian film director. He taught at the directing department of Academy of Performing Arts in Sarajevo.

He died of a heart attack at the age of 44.

Filmography
Praznik u Sarajevu (Holiday in Sarajevo, 1991)
Mizaldo, kraj Teatra (Mizaldo, By the Theater, 1994)
Dobro uštimani mrtvaci (Well-Tempered Corpses, 2005)

External links

References

1962 births
2006 deaths
Film people from Sarajevo
Bosnia and Herzegovina film directors